James Larry Grantham (September 16, 1938 – June 17, 2017) was an American collegiate and professional football player.

Biography
A member of the Ole Miss Athletic Hall of Fame, he was a linebacker at the University of Mississippi who came to the American Football League's New York Titans in the 1960 college draft and helped form the backbone of a New York Jets defense that reached the playoffs in 1968 and 1969, and in 1968 captured the AFL Championship and the World Championship, over the NFL's Baltimore Colts. Therein Grantham's team, with him as a starter throughout, went from being the worst team in an upstart league (the AFL) to World Champions in just nine years.

From his right outside linebacker spot, Grantham wrought havoc on opposing offenses. He recorded 24 interceptions, with his most being five in 1960 and 1967. Unofficially, he also had 38.5 sacks in his career. In a ten year span from his rookie year in 1960 to 1969, he was named an All-Pro eight times, with five of them being first-team, and he was named to the All-Star team five times. He was selected to the Second-team of the American Football League All-Time Team.

He is one of only twenty players to have competed in the American Football League for its entire ten-year existence, and one of only seven AFL players to have played their entire careers in one city. Grantham was also named the 1971 New York Jets MVP.

He played one last season in 1974 for the Florida Blazers of the start-up World Football League.  The Blazers made it to World Bowl 1, losing to the Birmingham Americans.

The Professional Football Researchers Association named Grantham to the PRFA Hall of Very Good Class of 2014

Death
Grantham died on June 17, 2017 from complications of chronic obstructive pulmonary disease.  He was 78.

See also
 List of American Football League players

References

1938 births
2017 deaths
People from Crystal Springs, Mississippi
Players of American football from Mississippi
American football linebackers
Ole Miss Rebels football players
New York Titans (AFL) players
New York Jets players
American Football League players
American Football League All-Star players
American Football League All-Time Team
Florida Blazers players
National Football League announcers
New York Jets announcers